This is a list of professional and semi-professional theaters on the territory of the Republic of Serbia.

List

See also 
 Serbian culture

External links 
 Atlas of Serbian Theatre

!

Serbia
The